Life on the Hegn Farm is a 1938 Danish family film directed by Arne Weel, Lau Lauritzen Jr. and Alice O'Fredericks. It is based on a 1907 play by Danish writer Jeppe Aakjær. Weel directed a Swedish remake The People of Högbogården in 1939.

Cast
 Holger Reenberg - Wolle Rævsgaard
 Willy Bille - Karen Rævsgaard
 Karin Nellemose - Trine Rævsgaard
 Peter S. Andersen - Gamle Kræn Rævsgaard
 Carl Heger - Visti Andersen
 Axel Frische - Per Søwren
 Sigrid Neiiendam - Ane Søwren
 Erik Henning-Jensen - Gaardejer 'Hellig-Mads' Villadsen
 Carlo Wieth - Proprietær Nørholm
 Kai Paaske - Gaardejer Esper Vøvtrup
 Sigurd Wantzin - Gaardejer Søren Østergaard
 Petrine Sonne - Bitte-fip
 Jakob Nielsen - Forkarlen Anders
 Alfred Bagger - Røgteren Søren
 Karen Marie Løwert - Mette
 Carl Lundbeck - Slagter Ræber
 Kai Holm - Kromand Sigvaldsen

References

External links

1938 films
1930s Danish-language films
Danish black-and-white films
Films directed by Arne Weel
Films directed by Lau Lauritzen Jr.
Films directed by Alice O'Fredericks
Danish drama films
1938 drama films